Emiel Vermeulen (born 16 February 1993 in La Louvière) is a Belgian cyclist, who currently rides for UCI Continental team .

Major results

2010
 3rd Road race, National Junior Road Championships
2011
 5th Omloop der Vlaamse Gewesten
 5th Omloop Mandel-Leie-Schelde Juniors
2015
 9th Nationale Sluitingprijs
 10th Kernen Omloop Echt-Susteren
2016
 2nd Gooikse Pijl
 3rd Grote Prijs Marcel Kint
 6th Ronde van Noord-Holland
 8th Omloop Mandel-Leie-Schelde
2017
 2nd Famenne Ardenne Classic
 3rd Gooikse Pijl
 4th Grand Prix de la Ville de Lillers
 7th Overall Paris–Arras Tour
 8th Kampioenschap van Vlaanderen
 10th Grand Prix de la ville de Pérenchies
 10th Paris–Troyes
2018
 2nd Grand Prix de la ville de Pérenchies
 4th Kampioenschap van Vlaanderen
 8th Omloop van het Houtland
2019
 1st Grand Prix de la ville de Nogent-sur-Oise
 4th Grand Prix d'Isbergues
 5th Grand Prix de Denain
 6th Cholet-Pays de Loire
 7th Kampioenschap van Vlaanderen
2020
 8th Grand Prix d'Isbergues
2021
 1st Grand Prix de la ville de Pérenchies
 8th Grote Prijs Jean-Pierre Monseré
2022
 4th Grand Prix de la ville de Pérenchies
 4th Sluitingsprijs Putte-Kapellen
 7th Izegem Koers
 10th Zwevezele koers

References

External links

1993 births
Living people
Belgian male cyclists
People from Ardooie
Cyclists from West Flanders